IHS Markit Ltd was an information services provider that completed a merger with S&P Global in 2022. Headquartered in London, it was formed in 2016 with the merger of IHS Inc. and Markit Ltd.

History

IHS
Information Handling Services (IHS) "was founded in 1959 as Information Handling Services to provide information for aerospace engineers through microfilm databases".

It subsequently grew to incorporate other companies in the information services sector such as Cambridge Energy Research Associates, Global Insight, Jane's Information Group, Prime Publications Limited, and John S. Herold, Inc.

In 2008, IHS acquired Fairplay, a firm that assigns IMO identification numbers for ships, companies and registered owners.

In 2016, Englewood, Colorado-based IHS and London-based Markit merged. Jerre Stead was chief executive of the pre-merger IHS Inc. from 2006 to 2013 and from 2015 until the merger with Markit.

Markit 
Markit was founded in 2003 as Mark-it Partners, a financial data provider for daily credit default swap pricing. The company grew via joint ventures and by acquiring other companies, merging with IHS in 2016.

S&P Global 
On 30 November 2020, S&P Global and IHS Markit released information about a definitive all-stock deal for around $44 billion, a deal which would be the largest of the year globally, according to Dealogic data. On September 9th, 2021, GlobalData announced its purchase of the Pricing and Reimbursement dataset from IHS Markit. In December 2021, the IHS Markit announced its intention to sell Base Chemicals to News Corp for a reported $295 million as part of an effort to alleviate concerns about competitive effects. The purchase by S&P Global was finalized on 28 February 2022.

IHS Markit acquisitions
 18 September 2008: IHS Inc. agreed to purchase the economics forecasting organization Global Insight for $200 million.
 10 June 2013: R.L. Polk, a provider of auto-industry data including used-car history company Carfax, for $1.4 billion.
 26 September 2017: automotiveMastermind Inc., a provider of predictive analytics and marketing automation for the automotive industry.
 26 September 2017: Macroeconomic Advisers, an independent research firm forecasting the US economy.
 3 August 2018: Ipreo, software solutions and data provider in global capital markets.
 10 October 2019: Novation Analytics, a specialist provider of software solutions, data analysis and advisory services.
 2019: Acquired Informa's Agriculture Intelligence in exchange for most of IHS Markit's Technology, Media and Telecoms division (including Screen Digest).
 1 May 2020: Catena Technologies Pte Ltd, a global regulatory trade reporting firm based in Singapore.

References

External links
 

Companies formerly listed on the New York Stock Exchange
Publishing companies established in 1959
Publishing companies of the United States
British companies established in 1959
Publishing companies based in London
2022 mergers and acquisitions
S&P Global